Live in Budapest is a live album by German heavy metal band, Stormwitch. It is currently Stormwitch's only official live release. It was recorded in 1989, slightly after fifth album Eye of the Storm.

Track listing
 "Intro"
 "Call of the Wicked"
 "Emerald Eye"
 "Stronger Than Heaven"
 "Tigers of the Sea"
 "Dorian Gray"
 "Guitar Solo"
 "Russian's on Fire"
 "Trust in the Fire"
 "Cheyenne (Where the Eagles Retreat)"
 "Walpurgis Night"

Personnel
 Andy Mück alias Andy Aldrian – vocals
 Lee Tarot – guitars
 Steve Merchant – guitars
 Andy Hunter – bass
 Pete Lancer – drums

Stormwitch albums
1989 live albums